Campiglossa spenceri is a species of fruit fly in the family Tephritidae.

Distribution
The species is found in Vietnam.

References

Tephritinae
Insects described in 1973
Diptera of Asia